Simon Jurgens Bezuidenhout (born 11 July 1946) is a former South African cricketer who played first-class cricket for Eastern Province in South Africa from 1968 to 1982.

Bezuidenhout was a batsman who spent most of his career as an opener.  His highest first-class score was 141, batting at number six in the 1970–71 Currie Cup against Transvaal. His highest List A cricket score was 114 not out against the South Africa African XI in 1976–77.

References

External links
 

1946 births
Living people
South African cricketers
Eastern Province cricketers
Cricketers from Pretoria